Burnley Football Club is an English association football club based in Burnley, Lancashire, that competes in the EFL Championship, the second tier of English football, following relegation from the 2021–22 Premier League. Founded on 18 May 1882, it was one of the first to become professional (in 1883), and subsequently put pressure on the Football Association to permit payments to players. The club entered the FA Cup for the first time in 1885–86 and was one of the 12 founder members of the Football League in 1888–89. From the 1950s until the 1970s, under chairman Bob Lord, the club became renowned for its youth policy and scouting system, and was one of the first to set up a purpose-built training ground.

Burnley have been champions of England twice, in 1920–21 and 1959–60, have won the FA Cup once, in 1913–14, and have won the FA Charity Shield twice, in 1960 and 1973. They have been runners-up in the First Division twice, in 1919–20 and 1961–62, and FA Cup runners-up twice, in 1946–47 and 1961–62. Burnley are one of only five sides to have won all four professional divisions of English football, along with Wolverhampton Wanderers, Preston North End, Sheffield United and Portsmouth. When the team won the 1959–60 Football League, the town of Burnley—with 80,000 inhabitants—became one of the smallest to have an English first-tier champion.

The team have played home games at Turf Moor since 1883, after they had moved from their original premises at Calder Vale. The club colours of claret and blue were adopted before the 1910–11 season in tribute to the then Football League champions Aston Villa. The club is nicknamed "the Clarets" because of the dominant colour of its home shirts. Burnley's current emblem is based on the town's coat of arms. The team have a long-standing rivalry with nearby club Blackburn Rovers, with whom they contest the East Lancashire Derby.

History

Beginnings and the first major honours (1882–1946) 

The club was founded on 18 May 1882 by members of rugby team Burnley Rovers, who voted for a shift to association football, since other sports clubs in the area had changed their codes to football. The suffix "Rovers" was dropped a few days later. The side won their first silverware in 1883: the Dr Dean's Cup, a knockout competition between amateur clubs in the Burnley area. By the end of the year, the club turned professional and signed many Scottish players. Burnley refused to join the Football Association (FA) and its FA Cup, since the association barred professional players. In 1884, Burnley led a group of 35 other clubs in the formation of the breakaway British Football Association (BFA) to challenge the FA's supremacy. The FA changed its rule in 1885, allowing professionalism, and Burnley made their first appearance in the FA Cup in 1885–86. In October 1886, Burnley's Turf Moor became the first professional ground to be visited by a member of the Royal Family, when Prince Albert Victor attended a friendly between Burnley and Bolton Wanderers. The club was among the twelve founders of the Football League in 1888–89 and one of the six based in Lancashire. In the second match, William Tait became the first player to score a league hat-trick, when his three goals gave Burnley their inaugural win in the competition. In 1889–90, they claimed their first Lancashire Cup, after beating local rivals Blackburn Rovers in the final.

Burnley were relegated to the Second Division for the first time in 1896–97. The team won the division the next season; only two of thirty matches were lost before promotion was gained through a four-team play-off series called test matches, although the last game against First Division club Stoke was controversial. The tie finished 0–0 as both needed only a draw for a top flight place; it was later named "[t]he match without a shot at goal". Burnley were relegated again in 1899–1900 and found themselves at the centre of controversy when their goalkeeper, Jack Hillman, attempted to bribe opponents Nottingham Forest in the last match of the season. It is possibly the earliest recorded case of match fixing in football. The side continued to play in the Second Division and even finished in bottom place in 1902–03—but were re-elected—as the club got into financial difficulties.

Harry Windle was named chairman in 1909, after which the club's finances turned around. The directors appointed John Haworth as the new manager in 1910, who changed the club's colours from green to the claret and blue of Aston Villa, the then First Division champions, as Haworth and the Burnley committee believed it might bring a change of fortune. In 1912–13, the side won promotion to the first tier; the following season, Burnley won their first major honour, beating Liverpool in the 1914 FA Cup Final. Bert Freeman scored the only goal, as Burnley became the first club to defeat five top tier sides in one cup season. Tommy Boyle became the first captain to receive the trophy from a reigning monarch, King George V. The team finished second to West Bromwich Albion in 1919–20, before winning their first ever First Division championship in 1920–21. Burnley lost the opening three games but went unbeaten in the following 30 league matches, setting an English record. Nine seasons later, the team were relegated to the Second Division. They struggled in the second tier and avoided a further relegation in 1931–32 by two points. The years through to the outbreak of the Second World War were characterised by mid-table league finishes.

Progressive and golden era (1946–1976) 
In the first season of post-war League football, Burnley gained promotion and reached the 1947 FA Cup Final but were defeated by Charlton Athletic after extra time. The team's defence was nicknamed "The Iron Curtain", since they only conceded 29 goals in 42 league matches. Alan Brown was appointed manager in 1954, and Bob Lord chairman a year later. The club became one of the most progressive around under their tenures. Burnley were one of the first to set up a purpose-built training ground, at Gawthorpe, and they became renowned for their youth policy and scouting system, which yielded many young talents. In 1958, former Burnley player Harry Potts was appointed manager. His squad mainly revolved around the duo of captain Jimmy Adamson and Jimmy McIlroy, the team's playmaker. Potts often employed the then unfashionable 4–4–2 formation and he implemented a Total Football playing style.

Burnley clinched a second First Division title in 1959–60. They had not topped the table until the last match was played out. The squad cost only £13,000 (equivalent to £ in ) in transfer fees—£8,000 on McIlroy in 1950 and £5,000 on left-back Alex Elder in 1959. The other players came from their youth academy. With 80,000 inhabitants, the town of Burnley became one of the smallest to have an English first tier champion. They travelled to the United States after the season ended to represent England in the International Soccer League, the first modern international American soccer tournament. The following season, Burnley played in European competition for the first time in the 1960–61 European Cup. They defeated former finalists Stade de Reims in the first round, but went out against Hamburger SV in the quarter-finals. The team finished the 1961–62 First Division as runners-up to newcomers Ipswich Town after winning only one of the last ten matches, and had a run to the 1962 FA Cup Final but lost against Tottenham Hotspur. Adamson was named FWA Footballer of the Year, however, with McIlroy as runner-up.

The maximum wage in the Football League was abolished in 1961, which meant that clubs from small towns like Burnley could no longer compete financially with sides from bigger towns and cities. The controversial departure of McIlroy to Stoke City in 1963 and Adamson's retirement in 1964 also damaged the club's fortunes. Burnley retained their place in the First Division throughout the decade, however, finishing third in 1965–66 to qualify for the 1966–67 Inter-Cities Fairs Cup. Potts was replaced by Adamson as manager in 1970. Adamson hailed his squad as the "Team of the Seventies", but he was unable to halt the slide as relegation followed in 1970–71. Burnley won the Second Division title in 1972–73, and were invited to play in the 1973 FA Charity Shield, where they emerged as winners against Manchester City. In 1975, the team were victims of one of the great FA Cup shocks of all time when Wimbledon, then in the Southern League, won 1–0 at Turf Moor. Adamson left the club in January 1976, and relegation from the First Division followed later that year. During this period, a drop in home attendances combined with an enlarged debt forced Burnley to sell star players such as Martin Dobson and Leighton James, which caused a rapid decline.

Near oblivion and recovery (1976–2009) 

The team were relegated to the Third Division for the first time in 1979–80. Under the management of former Burnley player Brian Miller, they returned to the second tier as champions in 1981–82. However, this return was short-lived and lasted only one year. Managerial changes continued to be made in a search for success; Miller was replaced by Frank Casper in early 1983, he by John Bond before the 1983–84 season and Bond himself by John Benson a season later. Bond was the first manager since Frank Hill (1948–1954) without a previous playing career at the club. He was criticised by the fans for signing expensive players increasing Burnley's debt, and for selling the young talents Lee Dixon, Brian Laws and Trevor Steven. Benson was in charge when Burnley were relegated to the Fourth Division for the first time at the end of the 1984–85 season. The team avoided relegation to the Football Conference, the highest level of non-League football, on the last day in 1986–87, after they won against Orient and their rivals drew or lost.

In 1988, Burnley played Wolverhampton Wanderers in the Final of the Associate Members' Cup but lost 2–0. The match was attended by 80,000 people, a record for a match between two sides from the fourth tier. The team won the Fourth Division in 1991–92 under manager Jimmy Mullen. He had succeeded Casper in October 1991 and won his first nine league matches as manager. By winning the fourth tier, Burnley became only the second club to win all four professional divisions of English football, after Wolverhampton Wanderers. Burnley won the Second Division play-offs in 1993–94 and gained promotion to the second tier. Relegation followed after one season, and in 1997–98 only a last-day victory over Plymouth Argyle prevented relegation back into the fourth tier. Under manager Stan Ternent, Burnley finished second in 1999–2000 and won promotion to the second tier.

In early 2002, financial problems caused by the collapse of ITV Digital brought the club close to administration. Ternent was sacked in 2004, after he avoided relegation with a squad composed of several loaned players and some players who were not entirely fit. The 2008–09 campaign, with Owen Coyle in charge, ended with promotion to the Premier League. Sheffield United were defeated in the Championship play-off Final, which meant a return to the top flight after 33 years. Burnley also reached the semi-final of the League Cup for the first time in over 25 years but were beaten on aggregate by Tottenham in the last minutes of the second leg.

Premier League football and back in Europe (2009–present) 

Promotion made the town of Burnley one of the smallest to host a Premier League club. The team started the season well and became the first newly promoted side in the competition to win their first four home games. However, Coyle left the club in January 2010 to manage local rivals Bolton Wanderers. He was replaced by former Burnley player Brian Laws, but the team's form plummeted and they were relegated after a single season. Sean Dyche was appointed manager in October 2012. In his first full season in charge, Dyche guided Burnley back to the Premier League in 2013–14 on a tight budget and with a small squad. The team went down after one season but won the Championship title on their return in 2015–16, when they equaled their 2013–14 club record of 93 points, and ended the season with a run of 23 league games undefeated. In 2017, the club completed construction of Barnfield Training Centre—the replacement of Gawthorpe—with Dyche being involved in the training ground's design. Burnley finished seventh in 2017–18, which meant qualification for the 2018–19 UEFA Europa League and a return to European football after 51 years. The team failed to reach the group stage, as they were eliminated in the play-off round by Greek club Olympiacos.

In December 2020, American investment company ALK Capital acquired an 84% stake in Burnley for £170 million. It was the first time the club was run by anyone other than local businessmen and Burnley supporters. In 2021–22, Burnley were relegated back to the Championship after they lost on the final matchday and finished in 18th place.

Club identity

Kits and colours 

In the early years, Burnley used various kit designs and colours. Throughout the first eight years, there were various permutations of blue and white, the colours of the club's forerunners Burnley Rovers. Before the start of the 1890–91 season, the club adopted an all-blue shirt, but changed it to all-white mid-season. After several years of claret and amber stripes, for much of the mid-1890s a combination of black with amber was used, although the team wore a shirt with pink and white stripes during the 1894–95 season. Between 1897 and 1900, the club used an all-red shirt and from 1900 until 1910 it wore an all-green jersey. In 1910, Burnley changed their colours to claret and blue, which they have had for most of their history, save for a spell in white shirts during the second half of the 1930s and the Second World War. The adoption of the claret and blue combination paid homage to Football League champions Aston Villa, who wore those colours. Burnley's committee and manager John Haworth believed it might bring a change of fortune. The club decided to re-register its colours as claret and blue in 1946, partly due to readers' letters to the Burnley Express.

Burnley's jerseys were manufactured by local companies until 1975, when Umbro became the first to have its logo on the club's shirt. Since 1975, the team have had a variety of kit manufacturers and shirt sponsors. The club's first kit sponsor was POCO in 1982, while the mobile game Golf Clash became its first sleeve sponsor in 2017.

Crest 

Burnley's first use of a crest was in December 1887, when they wore the royal arms on the shirt. Prince Albert Victor had watched the team play against Bolton Wanderers at Turf Moor in October 1886—the first visit to a professional football ground by a member of the royal family. To commemorate the visit, the club received a set of white jerseys featured with a blue sash and embellished with the royal coat of arms. The crest was regularly worn on the shirts until 1895, when it disappeared. During the 1914 FA Cup Final, watched by King George V, it featured again on the kits. From 1914, the team played in unadorned shirts, although they wore the coat of arms of Burnley during the 1934–35 FA Cup semi-final and the 1947 FA Cup Final. After winning the First Division in 1960, Burnley were allowed to wear the town's crest on their shirts. From 1969 to 1975, the team bore the letters "BFC" running downwards from left to right. In 1975, the club adopted a horizontal "BFC" cypher lettered in gold. Burnley used a designed badge with elements from the town and the club on their home shirts from 1979, before they adopted a simple horizontal "B.F.C." in 1983, lettered in white. In 1987, the club reinstated the crest used from 1979 to 1983. To celebrate the 50th anniversary of the 1959–60 First Division title win in 2009, Burnley reintroduced the logo used from 1960 to 1969. The following season, its Latin motto "Pretiumque et Causa Laboris" (English: "The prize and the cause of [our] labour") was replaced with the inscription "Burnley Football Club".

The club's current badge is based on the town's coat of arms. The stork at the top of the crest refers to the Starkie family, who were prominent in the Burnley area. In its mouth it holds a Lacy knot, of the de Lacy family, who held Burnley in the Middle Ages. The stork stands on a hill and cotton plants—which represents the town's cotton heritage. In the black band, the hand represents the town's motto "Hold to the Truth", derived from the Towneley family. The two bees refer to the town's hard work ethic, while the lion represents royalty. The wavy claret line is a reference to the River Brun, which runs through the town.

Stadium 

The team have played their home games at Turf Moor since February 1883, which replaced their original premises at Calder Vale. The Turf Moor site has been used for sport since at least 1843, when Burnley Cricket Club moved to the area. In 1883, they invited Burnley to a field adjacent to the cricket pitch. Both clubs have remained there since, and only Lancashire rivals Preston North End have continuously occupied their stadium—Deepdale—for longer.

The ground originally consisted of only a pitch and the initial grandstand was not built until 1885. In 1888, the first league match at Turf Moor saw Burnley emerge as 4–1 winners over Bolton Wanderers, Fred Poland netting the first league goal at the stadium. Turf Moor's capacity was increased to 50,000 under the chairman Harry Windle during the 1910s. The ground hosted its only FA Cup semi-final in 1922, between Huddersfield Town and Notts County, and five years later it hosted its only full international match, between England and Wales for the British Home Championship. From the end of the Second World War until the mid-1960s, crowds in the stadium averaged in the 20,000–35,000 range, and Burnley averaged a club-record attendance of 33,621 in the 1947–48 First Division. The attendance record for a single match was already set in 1924 against Huddersfield Town in an FA Cup third round tie, when 54,775 spectators attended. In 1960, in an FA Cup fifth round replay game against Bradford City, there was an official attendance of 52,850. Some of the gates were broken down, however, and many uncounted fans poured into the ground.

Turf Moor consists of four stands: the North Stand (formerly the Longside), the Jimmy McIlroy Stand (formerly the Bee Hole End), the Bob Lord Stand, and the Cricket Field Stand for home and away fans. The current capacity is 21,944 all-seated. Turf Moor's field had a slope until 1974, when the pitch was raised to minimise it. During the mid-1990s, the ground underwent further refurbishment when the Longside and Bee Hole End terraces were replaced by all-seater stands as a result of the Taylor Report. In 2019, the club built two corner stands for disabled home supporters between the Jimmy McIlroy and both the North and Bob Lord Stands to meet the Accessible Stadium Guide regulations.

Supporters and rivalries

Supporters 
Burnley's supporters are mainly drawn from East Lancashire and West Yorkshire. The club is one of the best supported sides in English football per capita, with average attendances of 20,000 in the Premier League in a town of approximately 73,000 inhabitants. Burnley have numerous supporters' clubs across the United Kingdom and overseas. The club's fans have had a long-standing friendship with supporters of Dutch team Helmond Sport since the 1990s. Several Burnley and Helmond fans regularly make an overseas journey to visit each other's matches. For the 2022–23 season, Helmond Sport adopted a claret and blue away kit in tribute to Burnley.

A frequently sung chant since the early 1970s is "No Nay Never", an adaptation of the song "The Wild Rover", which has lyrics to offend main rivals Blackburn Rovers. In the early 1980s, a hooligan firm known as the Suicide Squad emerged from within Burnley's fanbase. The group later featured on the 2006 hooligan documentary series The Real Football Factories. In 2011, 12 members were sentenced to jail for a total of 32 years, after a high-profile incident with Blackburn Rovers supporters in 2009. The firm disbanded after the verdict.

Notable Burnley fans have included football pioneer Jimmy Hogan, who was a regular attendee at Turf Moor; journalist Alastair Campbell, who has been regularly involved in events with the club; and cricketer James Anderson, who also worked in Burnley's ticket office on a part-time basis. King Charles III is also a supporter of the club. In 2019, Burnley fan Scott Cunliffe was honoured by the UEFA with the #EqualGame Award "for his work as a role model highlighting diversity, inclusion and accessibility in football"; he ran to every away Premier League ground during Burnley's 2018–19 campaign and raised more than £55,000 for Premier League clubs' community trusts and community projects in Burnley.

A popular drink served at home matches since the First World War is "Béné & Hot"—the French liqueur Bénédictine topped up with hot water. The East Lancashire Regiment soldiers acquired a taste for the drink while stationed at the birthplace of the beverage in Fécamp, Normandy, during the war. They drank it with hot water to keep warm in the trenches, and the surviving soldiers later returned to the East Lancashire area with the liqueur. In excess of 30 bottles are sold at each home game, which makes the club one of the world's biggest sellers of Bénédictine; Turf Moor is the only British football ground to sell it.

Rivalries 

Burnley's main rivals are Blackburn Rovers, with whom they contest the East Lancashire derby, named after the region both clubs hail from. Games between these sides from mill towns are also known under the name "Cotton Mills derby". Both are founder members of the Football League and have won the First Division and the FA Cup. The two clubs are separated by only  and besides the geographical proximity, they also have a long-standing history of rivalry; the earliest competitive clash was a Football League match in 1888. Four years earlier, however, they had met for the first time in a friendly, "with considerable pride at stake". Burnley hold the better head-to-head record, as the side have won 43 games to Blackburn's 41. Burnley's closest geographic rivals are actually Accrington Stanley, but as they have never competed at the same level—although defunct club Accrington did—there is no significant rivalry between them.

Other rivalries include those with nearby clubs Blackpool, Bolton Wanderers and Preston North End. Burnley also share a Roses rivalry with West Yorkshire sides Bradford City and Leeds United. The team contested heated matches with Halifax Town, Plymouth Argyle, Rochdale and Stockport County in the 1980s and 1990s during their time in the lower leagues, although feelings of animosity were mainly one-sided; according to the Football Fans Census in 2003, Halifax and Stockport supporters considered Burnley to be their main rivals.

Players

First-team squad

Out on loan

Academy

Management

Football management 

Source:

Managers 

Burnley-born Harry Bradshaw was Burnley's first manager—he was appointed in August 1894—and was the first to win a league title with the club, taking them to the top of the Second Division at the end of the 1897–98 season. John Haworth was the first manager in the club's history to win a major honour, the FA Cup in 1914; under Haworth, Burnley also became champions of England for the first time in 1920–21. Harry Potts led the club to its second First Division title during the 1959–60 campaign. Jimmy Adamson (1972–73 Second Division), Brian Miller (1981–82 Third Division), Jimmy Mullen (1991–92 Fourth Division) and Sean Dyche (2015–16 Football League Championship) also led Burnley to league titles.

Owners 
In 1897, the club incorporated as a limited company. From their establishment until 2020, Burnley were run by local businessmen and supporters. In December 2020, Velocity Sports Partners (VSP), the sports investment arm of American management firm ALK Capital, acquired an 84% stake in Burnley for £170 million. Alan Pace, managing partner of ALK Capital, subsequently replaced Mike Garlick as the club's chairman. ALK borrowed much of the takeover money, and the loan debts were transferred to the club. As a result of this leveraged takeover, Burnley went from being debt-free to being saddled with debts of around £100 million, at interest rates of about 8 per cent. However, in January 2023, Burnley were one of only two Championship clubs to score a "good" rating on Fair Game's "sustainability index", which included calculations of financial stability.

Board of directors 

Source:

Chairmen 
The following have been chairman of the club's board of directors:

Honours and achievements 

Burnley were the second, and are one of only five teams to have won all four professional divisions of English football, along with Wolverhampton Wanderers, Preston North End, Sheffield United and Portsmouth. The club's honours include the following:

League 
First Division (Tier 1)
 Winners: 1920–21, 1959–60
 Runners–up: 1919–20, 1961–62
Second Division/Championship (Tier 2)
 Winners: 1897–98, 1972–73, 2015–16
 Promoted: 1912–13, 1946–47, 2013–14
 Play–off winners: 2008–09
Third Division/Second Division (Tier 3)
 Winners: 1981–82
 Promoted: 1999–2000
 Play–off winners: 1993–94
Fourth Division (Tier 4)
 Winners: 1991–92

Cup 
FA Cup
 Winners: 1913–14
 Runners–up: 1946–47, 1961–62
FA Charity Shield
 Winners: 1960 (shared), 1973
 Runners–up: 1921
Texaco Cup
 Runners–up: 1973–74
Anglo-Scottish Cup
 Winners: 1978–79
Associate Members' Cup
 Runners–up: 1987–88

Regional 
Lancashire Cup
 Winners: (12) 1889–90, 1914–15, 1949–50, 1951–52, 1959–60, 1960–61, 1961–62, 1964–65, 1965–66, 1969–70, 1971–72, 1992–93

Records and statistics 

The record for the most first team appearances in all competitions for Burnley is held by goalkeeper Jerry Dawson, who played 569 games between 1907 and 1929. The club's top goal scorer is George Beel, who scored 188 goals from 1923 to 1932. In 1962, Jimmy Adamson won the FWA Footballer of the Year award, the first and to date only time a Burnley player achieved this. Willie Irvine became top goal scorer in the first tier in 1965–66 with 29 goals, a unique feat in the club's history. Jimmy McIlroy is the most capped player while at the club, as he made 51 appearances for Northern Ireland between 1951 and 1962. The first Burnley player to play in a full international match was John Yates, who took to the field for England against Ireland in March 1889. He scored a hat-trick but was never called up again. In January 1957, 17-year-old Ian Lawson netted a record four goals on his debut against Chesterfield in the FA Cup third round. The youngest player to play for the club is Tommy Lawton, who was aged 16 years and 174 days on his debut against Doncaster Rovers in the Second Division on 28 March 1936. His debut made him the then youngest centre-forward ever to play in the Football League. The oldest player is Len Smelt, who played his last match aged 41 years and 132 days against Arsenal in the First Division on 18 April 1925.

The club's largest win in league football was a 9–0 victory against Darwen in the 1891–92 Football League. Burnley's largest victories in the FA Cup have been 9–0 wins over Crystal Palace (1908–09), New Brighton (1956–57) and Penrith (1984–85). The largest defeat is an 11–0 loss to Darwen Old Wanderers in the 1885–86 FA Cup first round, when Burnley fielded their reserve side, as most professionals were still prohibited entry due to rules of the FA that season. The team's longest unbeaten run in the league was between 6 September 1920 and 25 March 1921, to which they remained unbeaten for 30 games on their way to the First Division title. It stood as the longest stretch without defeat in a single English professional league season until Arsenal bettered it in 2003–04.

The club's highest home attendance is 54,775, for an FA Cup third round match against Huddersfield Town on 23 February 1924; Burnley's record home attendance in the league is 52,869, for a First Division game against Blackpool on 11 October 1947. The highest transfer fees received are the £25 million from Everton and Newcastle United for Michael Keane and Chris Wood in 2017 and 2022 respectively; the highest transfer fee paid by the club was both for Wood from Leeds United in 2017 and for Ben Gibson from Middlesbrough in 2018. The pair were bought for a fee of £15 million each. Bob Kelly broke the world transfer record in 1925, when he moved from Burnley to Sunderland for £6,500 (equivalent to £ in ).

Notes

References
Specific

General

External links 

 
 Burnley F.C. on BBC Sport: Club news – Recent results and fixtures
 Burnley F.C. at Sky Sports
 Clarets Mad
 The Longside – Your Online Clarets Encyclopedia (archived)
 Clarets Trust

 
Sport in Burnley
Football clubs in Lancashire
Football clubs in England
Association football clubs established in 1882
1882 establishments in England
Premier League clubs
English Football League clubs
The Football League founder members
FA Cup winners